The Sporting News Executive of the Year Award was established in  and is given annually to one executive, including general managers, in Major League Baseball (MLB). The presenting company, originally known as The Sporting News, has been known as Sporting News since 2002. Listed below in chronological order are the baseball executives chosen as recipients of the award.

The first recipient of the award was Branch Rickey, who went on to win the award a total of three times, twice with the St. Louis Cardinals and once with the Brooklyn Dodgers. George Weiss, who had a long and fruitful career as an executive with the New York Yankees, has the most wins, four, with three of them coming consecutively in 1950–1952. The most recent repeat winner of the award is Billy Beane, who won the award in 1999, 2012, and 2018, all with the Oakland Athletics. Executives with the Yankees of the American League have won the award eight times, more than any other team. In the National League, the St. Louis Cardinals have the most wins, with seven. There has been one instance of the award being presented to an MLB executive rather than a team executive; Lee MacPhail in 1966.

Key

Award winners

Source:

See also
Baseball America Major League Executive of the Year
MLB Executive of the Year Award
List of Major League Baseball awards

References

Major League Baseball trophies and awards

Awards established in 1936